Marc Weber (born 21 March 1972 in Bochum) is a German rower.

References 
 
 

1972 births
Living people
Sportspeople from Bochum
Olympic rowers of Germany
Rowers at the 1996 Summer Olympics
Olympic silver medalists for Germany
Olympic medalists in rowing
German male rowers
World Rowing Championships medalists for Germany
Medalists at the 1996 Summer Olympics